Gunnar Berg (11 January 1909 – 25 August 1989) was a Swiss-born Danish composer. A leading exponent of serialism in Denmark, he is considered to have written the first Danish serial piece, his Cosmogonie for two pianos, in 1952.

Berg was born to Danish and Swedish parents in Switzerland. He studied with Herman David Koppel from 1938 to 1943, and moved to Paris in 1948, where he became associated with Honegger and Messiaen. In 1952 he married the pianist Béatrice Duffour, who would later record much of his piano music. In the same year he became the first Dane to attend the summer courses at Darmstadt.

Arriving in Paris in 1948 he became part of the international modernist movement in post-War Europe by joining the circle around Olivier Messiaen. Here, Berg had inspiring encounters with key figures such as John Cage, Pierre Boulez and Karlheinz Stockhausen. Serial organization began to make its mark already in the newcomer's Pièce for trumpet, violin and piano from 1949, and henceforth Berg uncompromisingly yet in his very own fashion would remain faithful to the complex expressive mode of musical modernism, from now on always composing within the theoretical and aesthetic framework of serialism.

The centennial of Gunnar Berg's birth was celebrated with concerts, radio programmes, CD-releases, writings, printed scores, and exhibitions in Denmark, Switzerland, France, Germany, Austria, USA, Ukraine and China. These activities has caused a significant change in the understanding of and respect for his artistic oeuvre - being far from a cold speculative, mathematic game.

Working Group Gunnar Berg

Working Group Gunnar Berg - Agneta Mei Hytten, Erik Kaltoft and Jens Rossel - was formed after Gunnar Berg's death in 1989 by composer Tage Nielsen (1929-2003), editor and former head of the music section of DR, Mogens Andersen (1929-2008), pianist Erik Kaltoft and Jens Rossel with a view to raising awareness and understanding of Gunnar Berg's music.

The working group placed the largest part of Gunnar Berg's manuscripts and things left behind at the Royal Library in Copenhagen, released two double-CDs with historical recordings of Gunnar Berg's piano music on Danacord Records and coordinated the various actitivites in the centennial of Gunnar Berg's birth.

References

External links
 Working Group Gunnar Berg
 Edition SVITZER

1909 births
1989 deaths
20th-century classical composers
Danish classical composers
Danish male classical composers
Danish expatriates in Switzerland
Twelve-tone and serial composers
Danish people of Swedish descent
Swiss people of Danish descent
Swiss people of Swedish descent
20th-century Danish male musicians